Toni Zweifel (15 February 1938 – 24 November 1989)  was Swiss engineer who patented several inventions. He founded and served as director of the Limmat Foundation, a foundation that supports social projects all over the world with a majority of women as project beneficiaries. He was a numerary member of the Opus Dei. His process for beatification was opened by the Catholic Church.

References

External links

Further reading
 Agustín López Kindler, Given To Others. The Life of Toni Zweifel. Scepter Publishers 2020 ISBN 1594173990
 Joan Carroll Cruz, Saints For the Sick. Heavenly Help For Those Who Suffer. TAN Books

 Michael Jackson, Coincidences: Synchronicity, Verisimilitude, and Storytelling. (Chapter 'Chance Meeting') University of California Press 2021. ISBN 0520977017

1938 births
1989 deaths
Swiss engineers
Opus Dei members
Swiss Servants of God